Planell is a surname. Notable people with the surname include:

Diamara Planell (born 1993), Puerto Rican track and field athlete 
Josep A. Planell i Estany (born 1951), Spanish academic

See also
Planells, another surname

Catalan-language surnames